Eyes Open is a 2006 album by Snow Patrol.

Eyes Open may also refer to:

Music
 Eyes Open Tour, concert tour in support of the album by Snow Patrol
 "Eyes Open" (song), a 2012 song by Taylor Swift
 "Eyes Open", song featuring Twista from 13 (Havoc album)
 "Eyes Open", song by Gossip from Standing in the Way of Control
 "Eyes Open", song by Wolfmother from deluxe edition of Cosmic Egg

Television
 "Eyes Open", a season 4 episode of Burn Notice
 "Eyes Open", a series 11 episode of the UK medical soap opera Doctors

See also

 Eye Opener (disambiguation)
 Eyes Wide Open (disambiguation)
 Open Your Eyes (disambiguation)
 "Open Eyes", song by Saliva from Survival of the Sickest (album)